The North West Museum of Road Transport (formerly St. Helens Transport Museum or St. Helens Bus Museum) is located at the old St. Helens Corporation Transport bus depot in Hall Street, St Helens, Merseyside, England.

The collection of vehicles at the museum includes many examples of buses from local municipal bus companies, including St Helens, Liverpool, Southport, Widnes, Warrington and Chester, as well as vehicles from the former Merseyside Passenger Transport Executive. Whilst the majority of vehicles on display are buses, there are also classic cars, trucks and fire engines.

A substantial new attraction, The Museum of Fare Collection (the only specialist ticketing museum, archive and workshop in the country) commenced during 2009 and shows a worldwide collection of over 1050 ticket machines dating from as early as 1886. Visitors are invited to try these out under supervision.

A new Lecture Theatre and Events Venue opened in 2010 with specialist subject lecturers. A Visiting Speaker service is available. Free rides on vintage buses usually operate on 1st Sunday in month.

Reopened in September 2006 after a £1 million restoration of the old tram, trolleybus, and bus depot, which dates back to 1881, at which time it included stables for horse-drawn trams.

The museum is open every weekend, and has attracted over 30,000 visitors since its reopening.

See also

History of St Helens, Merseyside
Transport in St Helens
Trolleybuses in St Helens

References

External links
Official website

Museums in Merseyside
Transport museums in England
Bus museums in England